Lê Ngọc Tú (born October 9, 1990) is a Vietnamese professional basketball player who currently plays for the Hochiminh City Wings of the Vietnam Basketball Association (VBA).

Pro career

Hochiminh City Wings (2016)
Ngọc Tú joined the Hochiminh City Wings for the VBA's inaugural season. At the conclusion of the season, he was named the VBA'S Local Most Valuable Player and to the All-VBA First Team, finishing with averages of 11.6 points, 3.7 rebounds, and 2.3 assists per game.

Saigon Heat (2017-2018)
Ngọc Tú began his tenure with the Saigon Heat after he was picked up from the City Wings in the offseason for the 2017 VBA season. There, he became one of the league's most improved players, raising his output from the previous season to 13.5 points, 5.3 rebounds, and 2.8 assists, while shooting 35 percent from beyond the arc.

Hanoi Buffaloes (2018-present)
Prior to the start of the 2018 season, Lê Ngọc Tú decided not to re-sign with the Saigon Heat. Instead, he took his chances elsewhere in the 2018 VBA draft. On 22 March, he was drafted by the Saigon Heat with the 11th overall pick in the 2018 draft only to be traded to Hanoi Buffaloes for the 9th pick (Huỳnh Khang) and 15th pick (Huỳnh Thanh Tâm).

International career
Ngọc Tú made his debut for the Vietnam national team at the 2017 SEABA Championship in Quezon City. He finished the tournament averaging 7.7 points, 3.5 rebounds, and 2.3 assists per game.

He received his second call-up for the 2017 SEA Games in Kuala Lumpur.

Career statistics

VBA

|-
| style="text-align:left;"| 2016
| style="text-align:left;"| Hochiminh City
| 21 || 16 || 25.2 || .440 || .310 || .520 || 3.7 || 2.3 || 1.2 || .3 || 11.6
|- class"sortbottom"
| style="text-align:left;"| 2017
| style="text-align:left;"| Saigon Heat
| 17 || 17 || 32.1 || .480 || .350 || .770 || 5.3 || 2.8 || 1.4 || .1 || 13.5
|- class"sortbottom"
| style="text-align:left;"| 2018
| style="text-align:left;"| Hanoi Buffaloes
| 20 || 20 || 29 || .430 || .260 || .790 || 4.4 || 1.3 || 2 || .4 || 13.6
|- class"sortbottom"
| style="text-align:left;"| 2019
| style="text-align:left;"| Hanoi Buffaloes
| 15 || 15 || 27.4 || .370 || .230 || .670 || 6.1 || 1.6 || 1.9 || .1 || 11.8
|- class"sortbottom"
| style="text-align:center;" colspan="2"| Career
| 73 || 68 || 28.4 || .430 || .290 || .690 || 4.8 || 2 || 1.6 || .2 || 12.6

Awards and honors

VBA
VBA Local Most Valuable Player: 2016 
All-VBA First Team: 2016

References

External links
 Career statistics and player information from vba.vn

1990 births
Living people
Vietnamese basketball players
Saigon Heat players
Shooting guards
Sportspeople from Ho Chi Minh City
Competitors at the 2017 Southeast Asian Games
Southeast Asian Games competitors for Vietnam